Paracorynactis is a genus of corallimorphs from the western Indo-West Pacific. They are specialized predators of echinoderms, and are notable for preying on the destructive crown-of-thorns starfish (Acanthaster planci) among others. The genus is monotypic with the single species, Paracorynactis hoplites.

Taxonomy
Paracorynactis hoplites is the only species classified under the genus Paracorynactis. It belongs to the family Corallimorphidae of the corralimorph order Corallimorpharia. It was first described as Corynactis hoplites by the British biologists Alfred Cort Haddon and Alice M. Shackleton in 1893.

In 1980, it was transferred by the Dutch marine biologist Jacobus Cornelis den Hartog to the newly created genus Pseudocorynactis. In 2010, Ocaña et al. noted the difference in tentacle development between this species and other members of the family Corallimorphidae. It was again transferred to a new genus, Paracorynactis.

Description
Their tentacles end in extremely sticky balls (acrospheres) covered with stinging cells (nematocysts).

Distribution and habitat
Paracorynactis hoplites are known to occur in coral reefs in Australia, Indonesia, Malaysia, the Marshall Islands, Papua New Guinea, Philippines, and was recently encountered in Kenya. Most, however, can be found within  of the water's surface. Incidentally, these are areas which are also commonly used by their prey (echinoderms) for shelter.

Ecology and behavior
Paracorynactis hoplites polyps will continually move their tentacles in an effort to detect prey. When an acrosphere comes in contact with suitable prey, it will immediately stick unto the prey's skin while firing its stinging cells (nematocysts). The polyp then extends itself towards the prey, bringing all the other remaining acrospheres towards the prey until it is trapped. The body can extend to five times its normal length when doing this. The polyp will then slowly pull the prey towards its mouth and digest it. Once the soft tissues are dissolved, the undigested pieces of the prey (e.g. spines) are regurgitated.

Small prey are swallowed whole. Larger stiff-bodied prey, however, usually only get partially eaten before escaping by breaking the captured limb(s) off (autotomy). Captured large starfish, for example, usually only lose one arm.

Paracorynactis hoplites are highly efficient predators of echinoderms. They specialize in preying on sea stars and short-spined sea urchins. They are also known to prey on sea cucumbers, brittle stars, and nudibranchs to a lesser extent, which indicates that they can potentially prey upon all soft-bodied slow-moving animals. They are also believed to supplement their diet with plankton when prey is scarce, as with other corallimorphs and sea anemones. But they will also refuse additional food once a prey has been recently captured and digested.

Animals with smooth shells or long spines generally seem to be rejected as prey by Paracorynactis hoplites polyps. Among them are long-spined sea urchins like Diadema setosum, Diadema savignyi, and Echinothrix calamaris. Brittle stars of the genus Ophiomastix as well as shelled gastropods are also not attacked.

Paracorynactis hoplites is interesting for its ability to capture even large sea stars like horned sea stars (Protoreaster nodosus) and the crown-of-thorns starfish (Acanthaster planci). Paracorynactis hoplites also do not seem to be affected by the toxins of venomous echinoderms like the aforementioned crown-of-thorns starfish and the flower urchin (Toxopneustes pileolus); both of which are toxic to humans, fish, and other marine predators.

Paracorynactis hoplites are also used as hosts by several symbiotic species of cleaner shrimp that aren't affected by their stinging cells. These include Thor amboinensis (sexy shrimp), Stenopus hispidus (banded coral shrimp), Ancylomenes holthuisi, and Cuapetes lacertae. Several species of fish have also been observed living among the tentacles of Paracorynactis hoplites with no adverse effects. Among them are cardinalfishes like Ostorhinchus multilineatus (multi-striped cardinalfish), Ostorhinchus nigrofasciatus (blackstripe cardinalfish), and Cheilodipterus quinquelineatus (five-lined cardinalfish); and gobies like Trimma nasa (nasal dwarfgoby) and Eviota pellucida (neon pygmy goby).

Importance
Paracorynactis hoplites may prove valuable as natural population control measures for the highly ecologically destructive crown-of-thorns starfish.

References

Corallimorphidae
Hexacorallia genera
Cnidarians of the Pacific Ocean
Cnidarians of the Indian Ocean
Marine fauna of Oceania
Marine fish of Southeast Asia
Animals described in 1893
Monotypic cnidarian genera